Warabi, Saitama held a local election to the city assembly on June 3, 2007. The election was dominated by independents while the Japanese Communist Party gained most seats of the parties. Notable is the Liberal Democratic Party did not contest with official candidates.

Results 

|-
! style="background-color:#E9E9E9;text-align:left;" |Parties
! style="background-color:#E9E9E9;text-align:right;" |Votes
! style="background-color:#E9E9E9;text-align:right;" |%
! style="background-color:#E9E9E9;text-align:right;" |Seats
|-
| style="text-align:left;" |Japanese Communist Party (日本共産党, Nihon Kyōsan-tō)
| style="text-align:right;" | 5,971
| style="text-align:right;" | 
| style="text-align:right;" | 4
|-
| style="text-align:left;" |New Komeito Party (公明党, Kōmeitō)
| style="text-align:right;" | 4,422
| style="text-align:right;" | 
| style="text-align:right;" | 3
|-
| style="text-align:left;" |Democratic Party of Japan (民主党, Minshutō)
| style="text-align:right;" | 2,939
| style="text-align:right;" | 
| style="text-align:right;" | 2
|-
| style="text-align:left;" | Independents
| style="text-align:right;" | 14,102
| style="text-align:right;" | 
| style="text-align:right;" | 9
|-
|style="text-align:left;background-color:#E9E9E9"|Total (turnout 59.23%)
|width="75" style="text-align:right;background-color:#E9E9E9"| 33,126
|width="30" style="text-align:right;background-color:#E9E9E9"| 100.00
|width="30" style="text-align:right;background-color:#E9E9E9"| 18
|-
| style="text-align:left;" colspan=4 |Source: JanJan
|}
Warabi, Saitama
2007 elections in Japan
June 2007 events in Japan
Local elections in Japan